Mikhaylovka is a rural locality (a selo) in Kazanchinsky Selsoviet, Askinsky District, Bashkortostan, Russia. The population was 21 as of 2010. There is 1 street.

Geography 
Mikhaylovka is located 42 km northwest of Askino (the district's administrative centre) by road. Russkaya Kara is the nearest rural locality.

References 

Rural localities in Askinsky District